Amos Milton Musser (May 20, 1830 – September 24, 1909) was a Mormon pioneer who served in many church and community roles, including as an Assistant Church Historian of the Church of Jesus Christ of Latter-day Saints from 1902 until his death.

Early life
Musser was born at Donegal, Lancaster County, Pennsylvania.  Musser's father Samuel Musser died when he was two years old. The family moved to the vicinity of Quincy, Illinois in 1837. By this time his mother had gotten remarried to Abraham Bitner. When Musser was about 16 he was in the Battle of Nauvoo and then was driven with his mother and siblings into Iowa.  After he left Nauvoo Musser worked as a store clerk in Eddyville, Iowa. Musser was not baptized a member of The Church of Jesus Christ of Latter-day Saints until he arrived at Council Bluffs, Iowa in 1851.

Church service
On arriving in Utah Territory in 1851 as part of the Easton Kelsey Company, Musser became a clerk in the tithing office. The following year Musser was among the early Latter-day Saint missionaries to travel to India. R. Lanier Britsch's book Nothing More Heroic on this early LDS Church mission in India was written as if narrated by Musser. After this mission he returned to Utah in the William G. Young Company of 1857.

From 1860 to 1876 Musser served as a traveling bishop in Utah.  He was one of the most active traveling bishops and would visit all the major settlements in Utah at least twice a year.

In 1876, he was appointed assistant trustee-in-trust of the Church, a top ranking position in overseeing the assets and properties of the Church.  Shortly after this he was sent on a mission to the eastern United States.

Musser had served for several years as a clerk in the Church Historians office prior to his appointment as Assistant Church Historian in 1902.

Community service in Utah
Musser held several positions with the Deseret Agricultural and Manufacturing society.  He was connected with the Utah Bee Association and the Utah Silk Association.  Musser was one of the incorporators of Zion's Bank and Trust company.  He was also involved with promoting several plans to build railroads. While serving as traveling bishop Musser served as the general superintendent of the Deseret Telegraph Company. Musser served as Fish and Game Commissioner of Utah Territory from the late 1870s through the early 1890s.

Writer
Musser wrote many pro-Mormon pamphlets. He was also the editor of the Utah Farmer, an agricultural magazine, and The Palantic, a pro-Mormon literary magazine.

He wrote several pamphlets in defense of the faith of the Latter-day Saints. He authored "To The Press Of The United States" (Philadelphia, May 1877), a press release defending the faith in response to charges that the Latter-day Saints are a "blood-thirsty people" in newspaper coverage of the trial and execution of John D. Lee for his role in the Mountain Meadows Massacre.

Personal life and legacy
Musser married his first wife Ann Leaver on January 31, 1858. Musser also married Mary Elizabeth White in 1864, Belinda Marden Pratt in 1872 and Anna Seegmiller in 1874. Belinda was a daughter of Parley P. Pratt. Musser is the father of Joseph White Musser, who became a leader in the Mormon fundamentalist movement.

Musser died of "surgical shock" in Salt Lake City, Utah at age 79.

The community of Milton in Morgan County, Utah was named for A. Milton Musser.

References

External links
 

1830 births
1909 deaths
19th-century Mormon missionaries
American Mormon missionaries in India
American Mormon missionaries in the United States
American leaders of the Church of Jesus Christ of Latter-day Saints
Converts to Mormonism
Mormon pioneers
Official historians of the Church of Jesus Christ of Latter-day Saints
People from Eddyville, Iowa
People from Westmoreland County, Pennsylvania
Writers from Pennsylvania
Writers from Utah